Glyptotherium (from Greek for 'grooved or carved beast') is a genus of glyptodont (an extinct group of large, herbivorous armadillos) that lived from the Early Pliocene, about 4.9 million years ago, to the Early Holocene, around 7,000 years ago, in the United States, Mexico, Guatemala, Costa Rica, Honduras, El Salvador, Panama, Venezuela, and Brazil. The genus was first described in 1903 by American paleontologist Henry Fairfield Osborn with the type species being, G. texanum, based on fossils that had been found in the Pliocene Blancan Beds in Llano Estacado, Texas, USA. The genus has since been discovered in many more fossil sites. Another species, G. cylindricum, was named in 1912 by fossil hunter Barnum Brown on the basis of a partial carapace, teeth, and several additional fossils that had been unearthed from the Pleistocene deposits in Jalisco, Mexico. 

Glyptodonts were typically large, graviportal, herbivorous armadillos with armored carapaces that were made of hundreds of interconnected osteoderms, armor covering the tails, armored skull roofs, tall skulls, hypsodont teeth, pelves fused to the carapace, an amalgamate vertebral column, short limbs, and small digits. Glyptotherium reached up to 2 meters (6.56 feet) long and 400 kilograms (880 pounds) in weight, making it one of the largest glyptodonts but not as large as its close relative Glyptodon or Doedicurus, the largest known glyptodont. Glyptotherium is morphologically and phylogenetically most similar to Glyptodon, but Glyptotherium differs in several anatomical aspects including size, a shorter carapace, a relatively longer tail, and a slender zygoma, or cheek bone.

Glyptodonts evolved first during the Eocene, but greatly diversified in the Miocene and Pliocene, but their diversity diminished into the Pleistocene. Glyptotherium is considered an example of North American megafauna, of which most have become extinct, and may have been wiped out by changing climate or human interference. Glyptotherium was primarily a grazer, but also had a mixed diet of fruits and other plants, that lived on open grasslands. The armor could protect the animal from predators, of which many coexisted with Glyptotherium during its existence, including the "saber-tooth cat" Smilodon, the "bone-crushing dog" Borophagus, and the giant bear Arctotherium.

Etymology 
The generic name Glyptotherium comes from the Greek roots glyph meaning "carved" or "grooved", after its relative Glyptodon, and therion meaning "beast", a commonly used suffix for prehistoric mammals. The species name of the type species, G. texanum, is after the holotype's discovery in Texas. The species name cylindricum meaning "cylindrical" is after the cylindroid anatomy of the premolars in the holotype of G. cylindricum.

History and taxonomy 
Fossils attributable to Glyptotherium have been found as early as the 1870s, when civil engineers J. N. Cuatáparo and Santiago Ramírez collected a skull, nearly complete carapace, and associated postcranial skeleton of a glyptodont from a drainage canal near Tequixquiac, Mexico, the fossils coming from the Rancholabrean Pleistocene. This was the first discovery of a glyptodont in North America. Cuatáparo and Ramírez named the fossils Glyptodon mexicanum in 1875, but the fossils have been lost. Another species of Mexican Glyptodon was described in 1889, G. nathoristi, by German paleontologists based on carapace remains from Pleistocene localities in Ejutla, Oaxaca. Both of these species have since been synonymized with G. cylindricum.

The first Glyptotherium fossils to be described from the United States were described in 1888 by paleontologist Edward Drinker Cope and consisted only of a single carapace osteoderm that had been collected from the Lower Pleistocene “Equus Beds” of Nueces County, Texas. Cope named his osteoderm Glyptodon peltaliferus, but Cope did not give the species a proper description that followed ICZN rules, making it a nomen nudum and it has since been synonymized with G. cylindricum . The next year, Joseph Leidy named Glyptodon floridanus based on isolated carapace osteoderms and pieces of caudal armor, though some were also referred to G. peltaliferus, that were collected from Pleistocene deposits in DeSoto County, Florida. This species is now seen as a nomen vanum and synonymous with Glyptotherium cylindricum.
Glyptotherium wasn't named until 1903 when fossils collected by an American Museum of Natural History expedition led by J. W. Gidley to the Early Pliocene strata from the Blanco Formation of Llano Estacado, Texas were described by Henry Fairfield Osborn as a new genus and species of glyptodont, Glyptotherium texanum. The fossils were deposited at the AMNH and consist of a carapace and associated postcranial elements, one of the few G. texanum skeletons known. The skeleton was put on display in the exhibit hall of the AMNH where it remains today.  

Another find came in 1910 when, while traveling in Jalisco, Mexico, fossil hunter Barnum Brown collected a complete dorsal carapace and several additional fossils, including teeth, of a single individual from the Pleistocene strata of the area. The specimen was sent to the American Museum of Natural History as well, where it was described by Brown in 1912 as a new genus and species of glyptodont, Brachyostracon cylindricum. Brown also recombined Glyptodon mexicanum into Brachyostracon mexicanum. Brachyostracon is now seen synonymous with Glyptotherium on the genus level, but G. cylindricum is a valid species. In 1923, Oliver Perry Hay named a new species of Glyptodon, G. rivipacis, based on the fossils described by Leidy from DeSoto County, Florida. This species is now seen as a nomen nudum and synonymous with Glyptotherium cylindricum. Hay also described well preserved fossils, including skull elements and teeth, that were collected from Rancholabrean strata in Wolf City and Sinton, Texas that were referred to Cope's Glyptodon peltaliferus. These fossils have since been referred to G. cylindricum. 

A third genus of North American glyptodont, Boreostracon floridanum, was established by George Gaylord Simpson in 1929 based on several isolated specimens unearthed by the AMNH from Rancholabrean age localities in Florida, the holotype specimen being the rear portion of a carapace recovered from Seminole Field locality in Pinellas County, Florida. Simpson referred all of the fossils previously described from Florida to B. floridanum and believed that all of the glyptodont fossils unearthed from North America were not of Glyptodon. However, Simpson didn't designate a new genus or species for Glyptodon peltaliferus, but he still believed that they were from a separate form of glyptodont. Boreostracon floridanum has been synonymized with Glyptotherium cylindricum.

Research into North American glyptodonts diminished after the research of Gidley, Hay, Simpson, and others, but some paleontologists still incorrectly referred fossils from the continent to Glyptodon.  

Throughout the 1920s and 1930s, many Early Pleistocene age fossils were collected from a locality in Frederick, Oklahoma, including several fragmentary fossils of glyptodonts, horses, gomphotheres, and camels. These glyptodont fossils were described as a new genus and species, Xenoglyptodon fredericensis, in 1953 on the basis of a partial lower jaw and several teeth. The species has been synonymized with Glyptotherium texanum. After all of these genera were named, a great reassessment wasn't conducted until 1981, David Gillette and Clayton Ray published a monograph on North American glyptodonts. In their monograph, they recombined all previously named genera and species into Glyptotherium, synonymized some species, and also researched the genus' ecology, anatomy, and distribution. However, G. arizonae, G. floridanum, and G. mexicanum were kept as valid species, all of which were synonymized with G. texanum and G. cylindricum after the discovery of more complete skeletons that proved their synonymy. After later review, the former species was synonymized with G. texanum and the latter two synonymized with G. cylindricum. From the 2000s to the 2020s, hundreds of additional fossils were referred to the genus from Central America and Brazil, including fossils formerly assigned to Glyptodon. In 2022, a host of fossils of Glyptotherium cylindricum including skulls, some preserving pathologies caused by humans, were described that had been collected from several sites in Falcon, northern Venezuela that dated to the Late Pleistocene-Early Holocene.

Taxonomy 
Glyptotherium is a genus in the subfamily Glyptodontinae, an extinct subfamily of large, heavily armored armadillos that first evolved in the Late Eocene (ca. 33.5 mya) and went extinct in the Early Holocene during the Quaternary extinction event (ca. 7,000 years ago). Glyptodontinae was classified in its own family or even superfamily until in 2016, when ancient DNA was extracted from the carapace of a 12,000 year old Doedicurus (a large, mace-clubbed glyptodont) specimen, and a nearly complete mitochondrial genome was reconstructed (76x coverage). Comparisons with the DNA of modern armadillos revealed that glyptodonts diverged from tolypeutine and chlamyphorine armadillos approximately 33.5 million years ago in the late Eocene. This prompted moving them from their own family, Glyptodontidae, within the extant Chlamyphoridae as a subfamily, renamed Glyptodontinae. Following this genetic data and the fossil record, glyptodonts rapidly evolved their characteristic anatomy and enormous sizes (also known as gigantism), possibly due to the cooling of temperatures, dryer climates, expansion of savannahs, and the size of carnivores like Arctodus and Smilodon. Chylamyphoridae is a group in the order Cingulata, which includes all extant armadillos in addition to other fossil groups like Pachyarmatheriidae and Pampatheridae. Cingulata is itself within the basal mammal group Xenarthra, which includes an array of American mammal groups like Vermilingua (anteaters) and Folivora (sloths and ground sloths) in the order Pilosa. The following phylogenetic analysis was conducted by Frédéric Delsuc and colleagues in 2016 and represents the phylogeny of Cingulata using ancient DNA from Doedicurus to determine the position of it and other Glyptodonts:

The internal phylogeny of Glyptodontinae is convoluted and in a flux, with many species and families erected on the basis of fragmentary or undiagnostic material that lacks comprehensive review. It is usually considered its own family, but DNA analyses have reduced it to a subfamily with tribes instead of its own subfamilies. One tribe, Glyptodontini (typically labeled Glyptodontinae) is a group of younger, larger glyptodonts that evolved in the Middle Miocene (ca. 13 mya) with Boreostemma, but split into 2 genera, Glyptodon in the south and Glyptotherium in the north, though Glyptodon also lived in northern South America in Colombia. Glyptodontini is often recovered as more basal to most other glyptodonts like Doedicurus, Hoplophorus, and Panochthus. Glyptodontini is distinguishable from other groups for example in that it has large, conical tubercular osteoderms absent or only present on the caudal (tailward) notch on the posterior end of the carapace and different ornamentation of the armor on the carapace than the tail. The sister taxon, or closest relative(s) of another taxon, to Glyptotherium is the genus Glyptodon, which evolved in the Middle Pleistocene in Argentina. Glyptotherium is nearly identical to Glyptodon in many aspects, so much so that the first fossils of Glyptotherium to be described were misidentified as those of Glyptodon. 

When Glyptotherium was first described by Henry Fairfield Osborn in 1903, he placed it at the family level Glyptodontidae and although similar to Glyptodon, Osborn stated that it was closer in appearance and classification to Panochthus and Neosclerocalyptus (then Sclerocalyptus). Barnum Brown believed that his genus Brachyostracon and its 2 species, B. cylindricum and B. mexicanum, were in their own family of glyptodonts based on the elongation of the skull of the latter species and the width of the carapace compared to its length. Brown did not coin any new name for this family however, and instead classified the genus within Sclerocalyptidae along with South American glyptodonts like Panochthus, Neosclerocalyptus, and Plohophorus. George Gaylord Simpson classified his genus Boreostracon as a close relative of Glyptodon, but still believed that there were multiple North American glyptodont genera. Xenoglyptodon was placed as a glyptodont close to the other North American genera by Meade (1953), but its relation to South American genera wasn't stated.

Below is the phylogenetic analysis conducted by Cuadrelli et al., 2020 of Glyptodontinae, with Glyptodontidae as a family instead of subfamily, that focuses on advanced Glyptodonts:

Description 
Like its living relative, the armadillo, Glyptotherium had a shell that covered its entire torso, with smaller armor also covering the skull roof of the head, similar to a turtle. However, unlike the carapace of a turtle, the Glyptotherium shell was made up of hundreds of small hexagonal scales, with Glyptotherium preserving up to 1800 osteoderms or more in each individual. The axial skeleton of glyptodonts show extensive fusion in the vertebral column and the pelvis is fused to the carapace, making the pelvis entirely immobile. Glyptotherium was very graviportal and had short limbs that are very similar to those in other glyptodonts. The large tails of glyptodonts likely served as a counterbalance to the rest of the body and Glyptotherium's caudal armor ended in a blunt tube that was composed of 2-3 fused tubes, in contrast to those of South American mace-tailed glyptodonts. The digits of Glyptotherium are very stout and adapted for weight-bearing, though some preserve large claw sheaths that had an intermediate morphology between claws and hooves. During the Pleistocene, the diversity of glyptodonts diminished but increased in size, with the largest known glyptodont, Doedicurus, evolving in the Pleistocene. Glyptotherium weights and sizes vary, but G. texanum was smaller and lighter than the later species, G. cylindricum. One specimen of G. cylindricum was estimated at 350-380 kilograms, compared to 457 kg of its relative Glyptodon reticulatus. One specimen of G. cylindricum, AMNH 15548, preserved a carapace length of 1690 centimeters compared to just 1400 cm for MSM P4464, a G. texanum specimen.

Glyptotherium texanum differs from G. cylindricum in the configuration of the external sculpturing of symmetrical, hexagonal osteoderms in the dorsal carapace. In the osteoderms of adult G. texanum, the central figures of the osteoderms are flat or weakly convex and very large, while those of G. cylindricum are flat or concave and much smaller. In both species, the central figures of the osteoderms get larger towards the margins of the carapace.

Skull and mandible 
Glyptodont dentition lacks caniniforms or incisiforms and instead have all hypsodont (high crowned teeth adapted for grazing) molariforms, the cheek teeth are some of the most hypsodont and homodont known from terrestrial mammals. Glyptodont skulls have several unique features; the maxilla and palatine are enlarged vertically to make space for the molariforms, while the braincase is brachycephalic, short and flat. Dermal armor wasn't restricted to the carapace and tail, as the skull roof was protected by a "cephalic shield" made of osteoderms. Some paleontologists have proposed that Glyptotherium and some glyptodonts also had a proboscis or large snout similar to those in elephants and tapirs, but few have accepted this hypothesis. Only one complete skull is known from Glyptotherium texanum, while relatives like Glyptodon and Neosclerocalyptus are known from many skulls, giving a limited perspective on its anatomy. Glyptotherium's zygoma are narrow, slender, almost parallel, and close to the sagittal plane in frontal view; in Glyptodon, this structure is broader, robust, divergent rather than parallel and more laterally placed. Glyptotherium and other glyptodonts preserve large nasal passages and sinuses that may have had nostrils adapted to breath in the cold arid climates of the Americas during the Pleistocene. In turn, the infraorbital foramina are narrow and not visible in anterior view in Glyptotherium, but in Glyptodon they are broad and clearly visible in anterior view. In lateral view, the dorso-ventral height between the skull roof and the palatal plane in Glyptodon decreases anteriorly, contrary to Glyptotherium; the nasal tip is in a lower plane with respect to the zygomatic arch in Glyptodon, but in Glyptotherium is higher than the zygomatic arch plane. In Glyptotherium, the occlusal lateral profile is slightly curved, whereas it is strongly curved in Glyptodon. In Glyptodon, the Mm1 is distinctly trilobate both lingually and labially, nearly as trilobate as the mf2; on the contrary, Glyptotherium shows a very low trilobation of mf1, which is elliptical in cross section, the mf2 is weakly trilobate, and the mf3 is trilobate. In both genera, the mf4 to mf8 are fully trilobate and serially identical.

The mandibles of Glyptotherium and Glyptodon are very similar, but Glyptotherium's mandible is smaller by about 10%. The angle between the occlusal plane and the anterior margin of the ascending ramus is approximately 60 in Glyptotherium, while it is 65° in Glyptodon. The ventral margin of the horizontal ramus is more concave in Glyptodon than in Glyptotherium. The symphysis area is extended greatly in Glyptotherium antero-posteriorily compared to Glyptodon. The mf1 is ellipsoidal in Glyptotherium and the mf2 is ‘‘submolariform’’, while in Glyptodon both teeth are trilobate.

Carapace and osteoderms 

Glyptotherium, and all other glyptodonts, had a large dorsal carapace covering much of the dorsum that was made up of interconnected osteoderms. The carapace of Glyptotherium was shorter than that of its relative Glyptodon, but much more elongated than that of Boreostemma. The high point of the carapace was at the center of the midline, while Glyptodon’s was slightly displaced. Glyptotherium's carapace was strongly arched, with a convex pre-iliac and concave post-iliac, giving it a saddle-like overhang over the tail. In Glyptodon the top-bottom height of the carapace represents 60% of its total length, whereas in Glyptotherium it is taller at ca. 70%. The ventral margins of the carapace in Glyptotherium is much more rectangular and less convex than in Glyptodon. In Glyptotherium, the osteoderms in the antero-lateral areas of the carapace are less ankylosed than in Glyptodon, suggesting that the antero-lateral carapace regions of the former had more flexibility. The osteoderms of the caudal aperture are more conical in Glyptodon and more rounded in Glyptotherium, though in the latter the anatomy of the caudal aperture osteoderms varies by sex while in Glyptodon it varies by age. Although frequently used to differentiate the two taxa, Glyptotherium and Glyptodon have very similar osteoderm morphologies that differ only in several areas. Both genera have very thick osteoderms compared to those of many South American glyptodonts like Hoplophorus and Neosclerocalyptus, but Glyptotherium always preserve a "rossette" pattern, where the osteoderm's central figure is surrounded by a row of peripheral figures. Some Glyptodon specimens preserve these "rossettes", but others lack them. The central and radial sulci are deeper and broader in Glyptodon (ca. 4–6 mm) than in Glyptotherium (ca. 1–2.4 mm). Notably, Glyptotherium osteoderms preserve small gaps for hair follicles in the sulci that indicate that Glyptotherium had a "fuzzy" carapace with fur coming out. The number of follicoles varies between ages and the area of the carapace, with juveniles having more follicles than adults and fewer follicles are known from the lateral, caudal, and rear portions of the carapace.

Caudal rings 
Glyptotherium is a glyptodont, meaning its caudal armor is made up of a series of caudal rings ending in a short caudal tube, in contrast to the mace-like ends in other glyptodonts, but the morphology differs between Glyptotherium, Glyptodon, and Boreostemma. Overall, Boreostemma preserves a more similar caudal armor to Glyptotherium than to Glyptodon. The caudal armor is longer in Glyptotherium than in Glyptodon, with one specimen of G. texanum (UMMP 34 826) preserving a meter long set of caudal armor. In Glyptotherium, the caudal armor length represents circa 50% of the dorsal carapace's total length, whereas in Glyptodon, this value is lower at around 30-40%. Glyptodon has 8–9 complete caudal rings plus one caudal tube, but Glyptotherium preserves 1 incomplete caudal ring in addition to the 8–9 complete caudal rings and caudal tube. In both genera, each caudal ring is composed by two or three transverse rows of ankylosed osteoderms, where the distalmost row of osteoderms shows a more or less developed conical morphology. In Glyptotherium, in some specimens (e.g., AMNH 95,737) a low number of conical osteoderms (generally two). This is different from Glyptodon, in which most osteoderms of the distal row (up to 12) present a clear conical morphology. The terminal caudal tube is shorter in Glyptodon. In Glyptotherium, the terminal tube is composed of 2–3 ankylosed rings, whereas in Glyptodon, it has only two ankylosed rings. In Glyptotherium, this caudal tube represents ca. 20% of the total length of the caudal armor, whereas in Glyptodon, this structure represents 13% of the total length.

Paleobiology

Feeding and diet 
Glyptotherium was mainly a grazer, but also had a mixed diet of C3 and C4 plants based on isotope analyses of dental specimens recovered from the Late Pleistocene Cedral locality in San Luis Potosí, México. The locality preserves C4 plants from the families Poacea, Amaranthacea and Quenopodiacea, meaning that they were possible food sources for Glyptotherium. Cedral specifically was an area with hot springs and open grasslands next to them, suggesting that Glyptotherium’s fed in grasslands nearby water sources, like the feeding habits of modern Capybaras. Additional isotopic analysis of Glyptotherium and the giant ground sloth Eremotherium found the two to have similar isotopic levels to the extant amphibious Hippopotamous, indicating that they were semi-aquatic herbivores that fed on aquatic plants. Additional studies of dental specimens from eastern Brazil suggest that the Glyptotherium were grazers in moist, lowland tropical to subtropical habitats along rivers or water sources, supporting the semi-aquatic Glyptotherium hypothesis. Additional isotopic evidence from Brazil suggests that fruits were also part of Glyptotherium’s diets, though only around 20%. Glyptotherium and all other glyptodonts had hypsodont teeth, high-crowned teeth with rough, flat surfaces adapted for grinding and crushing, that were adapted to break down gritty, fibrous material like grasses. This diet for Glyptotherium contrasts with those surmised for their relatives Pampatheres, which have been considered insectivores or grazers. Like most other xenarthrans, glyptodonts had lower energy requirements than most other mammals. They could survive with lower intake rates than other herbivores with similar mass.

Eyesight 
Rod monochromacy is a rare condition characterized by the absence of cone photoreceptor cells in the eyes of vertebrates. It results in colorblindness and low acuity vision in dim-light conditions and blindness in bright-light conditions. Xenarthrans most likely only used vision at night, during twilight, and while in burrows. However, the understory of South America's rainforests may have been dark enough during the day to facilitate limited vision for species that dwelled there. Extinct glyptodonts' tough carapace and large body size might have compensated for their inability to see approaching predators.

Ontogeny 
Immature individuals of Glyptotherium texanum from juveniles to adults found in Blancan localities in Arizona preserve a nearly complete growth series, one of the few known in glyptodonts. The teeth of Glyptotherium preserve hypselodonty, where the teeth do not stop growing. In the juveniles, fully articulated osteoderm-to-osteoderm contact is already known, even at their age. Growth of the osteoderms continued from juveniles to sub-adults and ceased when osteoderms became ankylosed. The lateral profile of juvenile's carapaces are gently convex into the high arched carapaces of adults. Another ontogenetic change is in the sulci and peripheral figures of the osteoderms; the central figures are largest relative to the sulci in newborns and juveniles, but this ratio becomes lower in adults. In G. cylindricum however, the osteoderms grow much faster and the sulci are much smaller. The osteoderms are also relatively thicker in juvenile Glyptotherium individuals compared to adults.

Sexual dimorphism 
Individuals of Glyptotherium texanum found in Blancan localities in Arizona preserve sexual dimorphism between male and female individuals. The caudal aperture, large conical osteoderm that protect the base of the tail, of males and females differ in that the marginal osteoderms of males are much more conical and convex than those of females. Even in the carapaces of newborn Glyptotherium, the marginal osteoderms are either conical or flat, which enables their sex to be determined.

Osteoderms and protection 

Osteoderms of Glyptotherium are made of a cancellous trabecular core in between two compact layers. Each hexagonal osteoderm is joined to the adjacent osteoderms with sutures, creating a large, robust carapace similar to those in modern animals. However, the carapaces of glyptodonts like Glyptotherium were far less flexible than those of modern armadillos. The trabecular core was made up of struts used for support with an average thickness of 0.25 mm, these struts making up the central support of the osteoderm. Mechanical analyses revealed that smaller load areas, representing sharper objects, cause higher stresses than those caused by large, blunt objects. This can be understood as the natural structure evolved to withstand blunt impact from large objects such as tail-clubs and not as protection against sharp objects such as teeth. This presents further evidence for the theory that glyptodonts used their carapaces for intraspecific combat using tail clubs as well as defense.

Disease and pathologies 
A partial postcranial skeleton of Glyptotherium cylindricum found in northeastern Brazil that included partial limbs preserved 3 different types of arthritis: one type of inflammatory arthritis (spondyloarthropathy), one type of crystalline arthritis (calcium pyrophosphate deposition disease) and one proliferative arthritis (osteoarthritis). Spondyloarthropathy was the most prevalent, with bone erosion on the right ulna, right and left radii, a left femur and both right and left tibiae-fibulae and is associated with bone sclerosis on the right ulna and radius. Calcium pyrophosphate deposition disease is present on the articular surface of the left patella and osteoarthritis is represented by osteophytes on some of the left hindlimb. On several osteoderms that were also found in Brazil, ectoparasitism, lesions, and growths were found, some of these infections were likely caused by fleas.

Paleoecology 
Glyptotherium was primarily a grazer in forested grasslands and arboreal savannahs, though they may have preferred grasslands near water sources based on fossils from Mexico. Due to their wide distribution, Glyptotherium’s paleoecology may have varied across regions and its 2 species. Fossils from Guatemala were found from high altitudes, showing that Glyptotherium was highly adaptable and could live in a variation of environments. This is supported by the generalist diet of Glyptotherium and fossil's discoveries in tropical, subtropical, forested, and even semi-aquatic environments. In the Mexican state of Yucatan, fossils of Glyptotherium and the ground sloth Paramylodon are known from water-rich areas like riparian forests and swamps as opposed to open grasslands. 

In North America, Glyptotherium is known from 2 different species that lived in 3 different intervals, the Blancan, Irvingtonian, and Rancholabrean, across several US states and Mexico. During the Blancan, Glyptotherium texanum coexisted with many native genera from North America, as Beringia hadn't yet formed. Because of this, the fauna of the Blancan starkly contrasted with the fauna of the Pleistocene and Holocene. The Blancan age strata of western Texas, New Mexico, and Arizona preserves the gomphothere proboscideans Stegomastodon and Cuvieronius, equids represented by grazers like Nannipus and Equus. Other xenarthrans are also known, like the megalonychid ground sloth Megalonyx and the mylodontid Paramylodon. Fossils of small mammals have also been unearthed, like the insectivores Hesperoscalops and Sorex. A giant fossil ground squirrel, Paenemarmota, is also known from the Blancan. The carnivores include the unusual “bone-crushing” dog relative Borophagus and the “running hyena” Chasmaporthetes, in addition to the "saber-toothed" cat Smilodon gracilis. Some isolated bird fossils have also been found of vultures, falcons, and possibly corvids.

In the Brazilian Intertropical Region in eastern Brazil, Glyptotherium was a mixed grazer in arboreal savannahs, tropical grasslands, and other grassy areas near water sources. Large, mesoherbivore mammals in the BIR were widespread and diverse, including the cow-like toxodontids Toxodon platensis and Piauhytherium, the macraucheniid litoptern Xenorhinotherium and equids such as Hippidion principale and Equus neogaeus. Toxodontids were large mixed feeders as well and lived in forested areas, while the equids were nearly entirely grazers. Other xenarthran fossils are present in the area as well from several different families, like the giant megatheriid ground sloth Eremotherium, the scelidotheriids Catonyx and Valgipes, the mylodontids Glossotherium, Ocnotherium, and Mylodonopsis. Smaller ground sloths such as the megalonychids Ahytherium and Australonyx and the nothrotheriid Nothrotherium have also been found in the area. Eremotherium was a generalist, while Nothrotherium was a specialist for trees in low density forests, and Valgipes was an intermediate of the two that lived in arboreal savannahs. Other glyptodonts and cingulates like the grazing glyptodont Panochthus and the omnivorous pampatheres Pampatherium and Holmesina were present in the open grasslands. A proboscidean species has also been found in the BIR, Notiomastodon platensis, was also present and was a mixed grazer on the open grasslands. Carnivores included some of the largest known mammalian carnivores, like the giant felid Smilodon populator and the bear Arctotherium wingei. Several extant taxa are also known from the BIR, like guanacos, giant anteaters, collared peccaries, and striped hog-nosed skunks. Two crab-eating types of extant mammals are also known from the BIR, the crab-eating raccoon and the crab-eating fox, indicating that crabs were also present in the region. The environment of the BIR is unclear, as there were both several species that were grazers, but the precede of the arboreal fossil monkeys Protopithecus and Caipora in the area causes confusion over the area's paleoenvironment. Most of Brazil was thought to have been covered in open tropical cerrado vegetation during the Late Pleistocene, but if Protopithecus and Caipora were arboreal, their presence suggests that the region may have supported a dense closed forest during the Late Pleistocene. It is possible that the region alternated between dry open savannah and closed wet forest throughout the climate change of the Late Pleistocene.Smilodon may have occasionally preyed upon Glyptotherium, based on a skull from one Glyptotherium texanum individual recovered from Pleistocene deposits in Arizona bearing the distinctive elliptical puncture marks that best match those of the machairodont cat, indicating that the predator successfully bit into the skull through the armored cephalic shield. The Glyptotherium in question was a juvenile, with a still-developing head shield, making it far more vulnerable to the cat's attack.

In 2017, a right ulna of an adult Glyptotherium that had been collected from Late Pleistocene-Early Holocene strata in Rio Grande do Norte State, Brazil was described that bore several gnawing traces from a new ichnospecies of Machichnus, M. fatimae, that may have been caused by a juvenile of the canid species Protocyon troglodytes or an adult individual of Cerdocyon thous.

Relationship with humans 
The first report of possible human consumption or interaction with Glyptotherium or its fossils came in 1958, where several osteoderms that were possibly consumed by humans were described from the Clovis site in Lewisville, Texas, though there is little evidence to back up this assessment. In 2022, a host of fossils of Glyptotherium cylindricum including skulls were described that had been collected from several sites in Falcon, northern Venezuela that dated to the Late Pleistocene-Early Holocene. These discoveries were notable not only because they preserved skulls, but four of them exhibited breakages in the fronto-parietal region, a pattern in all of the skulls. Visual and CT evidence indicates that these were likely caused by a mechanical effect by direct percussion, most likely a blow with a stone chopper or club, which caused the bones in the region to fragment into the soft internal tissues of the skull. Despite the fact that the skulls were complete and showed no signs of taphonomic distortion or transport, they often lacked their jaws. The jaws may have been removed for "hunters" to access and consumed masticatory muscles and tongue. The coexistence of early hunter-gatherer humans and glyptodonts in South America was first hypothesized in 1881 based on fossil discoveries from the Argentine Pampas, and many fossil discoveries from the Late Pleistocene to Early Holocene have been unearthed since that exhibit human predation on glyptodonts. During this period, a wide array of Xenarthrans inhabited the Pampas were hunted by humans, with evidence demonstrating that the small (300-450 kg) glyptodont Neosclerocalyptus, the armadillo Eutatus, and the gigantic (2 ton) glyptodont Doedicurus, the largest glyptodont known, were hunted. The only other record of human predation from outside the Pampas was a partial carapace, found also in Venezuela, that was eviscerated by humans. The discoveries in the localities in Falcón showed the first signs of human hunting on the skulls of glyptodonts, but Glyptotherium also was more defenseless than glyptodonts like Doedicurus.

Distribution 

Glyptotherium is the only known North American glyptodont and is known from several regions of the continent from different periods. During the Blancan stage of the Early Pliocene, Glyptotherium texanum inhabited only central Mexico based on the discovery of a single osteoderm of Glyptotherium texanum from the early-middle Pliocene strata of Guanajuato, central Mexico. In the Blancan-Irvingtonian stages of the Early Pleistocene, G. texanum fossils are known from most of Mexico as well as the U.S. states of Arizona, Texas, Oklahoma, and Florida. In the Rancholabrean of the Late Pleistocene, G. cylindricum evolved from G. texanum and its fossils have been unearthed from northern Venezuela, eastern Brazil, Central America, Mexico, and the U.S. states of Texas, Louisiana, Florida, and even as far north as South Carolina. Fossils from Glyptotherium from the Early Pliocene have not been found in Central America, but it is likely that G. texanum inhabited the area during the Great American Biotic Interchange. Unfortunately, glyptodont fossils from the middle-late Irvingtonian are not known from North America, creating a “glyptodont gap” in the fossil record.

Although commonly regarded as an exclusively North American genus, fossils of Glyptotherium from northern South America in areas like Brazil and Venezuela have been discovered. These include fossils previously referred to Glyptodon and Hoplophorus from southeastern and northeastern Brazil, as many fossils were hastily assigned to both by 19th century paleontologists. One of the specimens reassigned to Glyptotherium, an isolated dorsal carapace osteoderm, was collected from Pleistocene age carbonate caves in Lagoa Santa, Minas Gerais, Brazil by Friedrich von Sellow during the early 1800s. It was later described as a new species of Hoplophorus, H. meyeri, in 1845 by Danish paleontologist Peter Wilhelm Lund. Lund incorrectly named the taxon however, making it a nomen nudum. The osteoderm was referred to Glyptotherium in 2010, making it the first known Glyptotherium specimen. The fossils from South America are usually only osteoderms or caudal rings and are sometimes indeterminate on a species level, but are most likely from Glyptotherium cylindricum.

Glyptotherium fossils have also been collected from Central America in Guatemala, Costa Rica, Honduras, El Salvador, and Panama. The fossils from Central America are usually isolated and fragmentary, with the majority being osteoderms or isolated molariforms. It is most likely that the first Glyptotherium populations started in Central America during the Great American Biotic Interchange in the Late Pliocene based on their paleobiogeography. Glyptotherium fossils from Central America are sometimes placed as an indeterminate species, but most are placed in Glyptotherium cylindricum or its synonyms. This referral is also based on the age of the fossils, as fossils from the Pliocene and early Pleistocene are from G. texanum while G. cylindricum is from the late Pleistocene.

See also 

 Glyptodon
 Boreostemma

References 

Prehistoric cingulates
Prehistoric placental genera
Pliocene mammals of North America
Pleistocene xenarthrans
Pleistocene mammals of North America
Zanclean first appearances
Holocene extinctions
Blancan
Irvingtonian
Lujanian
Rancholabrean
Pleistocene Brazil
Holocene Brazil
Fossils of Brazil
Pleistocene Costa Rica
Fossils of Costa Rica
Pleistocene El Salvador
Fossils of El Salvador
Pleistocene Mexico
Fossils of Mexico
Pleistocene Panama
Fossils of Panama
Neogene United States
Pleistocene United States
Fossils of the United States
Pleistocene mammals of South America
Pleistocene Venezuela
Fossils of Venezuela
Fossil taxa described in 1903
Taxa named by Henry Fairfield Osborn